Beşir Ayvazoğlu (born 11 February 1953) is a Turkish lyricist.

Ayvazoğlu graduated from the Bursa Institute of Education, Department of Literature. He taught Turkish and literature at various high schools.  Ayvazoğlu  is the author of the book Aşk Estetiği (The Aesthetics of Divine Love). He has also written poetry, essays, biographies, literary analyses, interviews. and plays.

See also 
 List of composers of classical Turkish music

References

External links
 Aşk Estetiği (The Aesthetics of Divine Love), Beşir Ayvazoğlu

Composers of Ottoman classical music
Composers of Turkish makam music
1953 births
Living people